Kuchmyn Yar Street is a street located in the Batyieva Hora neighborhood, Solomianskyi District of Kyiv, Ukraine. It is located between Petra Krivonosa Square and Rozdilna street. 

The street was founded in the 19th century and was originally named Kuchmyn Yar. Between 1955 and 2017 street was named Krasnodonska. Kyiv City Council deputies at a plenary meeting on Oct. 12, 2017, supported the renaming of ten streets in Kyiv and gave names to 39 new streets. Kuchmyn Yar became the new name for Krasnodonskaa. The embassy of Saudi Arabia in Ukraine is located on number 1-3, Kuchmyn Yar Street.

References

 Kyiv Web Encyclopaedia — Krasnodonska street (in Ukrainian)

Streets in Kyiv